Isa Khandaq (also Romanized as ‘Īsá Khandaq) is a village in Mazkureh Rural District, in the Central District of Sari County, Mazandaran Province, Iran. At the 2006 census, its population was 696, in 185 families.

References 

Populated places in Sari County